Idaea tacturata, the dot-lined wave moth, is a moth of the family Geometridae. The species was first described by Francis Walker in 1861. It is found in the US from Virginia to Florida, west to south-eastern coastal Texas.

The wingspan is 13–21 mm. Adults have pearly-white wings, with little or no speckling. There are four thin brownish, dotted or zigzag lines on the forewing that continue onto the hindwing. They are on wing year round in the southern part of the range.

The larvae feed on Trifolium species.

References

Moths described in 1861
Sterrhini
Moths of North America